Shavar Jeffries is an American civil rights attorney who in January 2023 became the CEO of the KIPP Foundation, a nonprofit which trains and develops educators to lead KIPP public schools; provides tools, resources and training for excellent teaching and learning; promotes innovation; and facilitates the exchange of insights and ideas across KIPP and other public schools and organizations. Previously, he was the president of Democrats for Education Reform, which promotes more charter schools, school funding and stricter teacher evaluations to revamp public education. A former assistant state Attorney General, he was a candidate in the 2014 election for Mayor of Newark, New Jersey, after which he became a partner at Lowenstein Sandler in August 2014.

Background
Jeffries grew up in the South Ward of Newark. He lost his mother to violence and was raised by his grandmother, a public school teacher. He first attended Newark Public Schools and later received a scholarship to attend Seton Hall Preparatory School in West Orange. Jeffries obtained his bachelor's degree from Duke University in 1996. After graduating he attended Columbia Law School where he served as managing editor of the Columbia Human Rights Law Review and clerked for the NAACP Legal Defense and Education Fund. He received his Juris Doctor in 1999. Jeffries lives in the South Ward with his wife, Tenagne Girma-Jeffries, and their two children.

Career
After law school, Jeffries clerked for Judge Nathaniel R. Jones of the U.S. Court of Appeals. He then worked as an associate with Wilmer Cutler & Pickering. Since 2001, Shavar has been counsel at Gibbons P.C., a firm based at the Gateway Center in Newark.

Jeffries has been an associate professor at the Center for Social Justice at Seton Hall Law School since 2004. In 2008-2010, he took a leave of absence to serve as Assistant Attorney General and Counsel to New Jersey Attorney General Anne Milgram and led several departments, including the Juvenile Justice Commission and the Civil Rights Division.

In April 2010, Jeffries was elected to the Newark Public Schools Advisory Board. He became a partner at Lowenstein Sandler in August 2014. In September 2015 he became the president of Democrats for Education Reform which promotes  more charter schools, school funding and stricter teacher evaluations to revamp public education.

Mayoral candidacy
Jeffries announced his election bid on May 20, 2013.
Jeffries was relatively unknown in Newark, where typically one runs first for council and then for mayor. Jeffries introduced a public safety plan in October 2013 As of January 2014, Jeffries had raised the most campaign financing of the candidates.

The election took place May 13, 2014 and Jeffries was defeated by Municipal Council of Newark Council Member Ras Baraka. Other potential candidates, Council Members Anibal Ramos, Jr. and Darrin S. Sharif,
 had earlier dropped out of the race.

Jeffries' eight-member council slate includes incumbents East Ward Councilman Augusto Amador, North Ward Councilman Anibal Ramos, Jr. and At-large Councilman Carlos Gonzalez and candidates Brian Logan (South Ward). Kevin Waters (West Ward) and Andre Speight (Central Ward). Lynda Lloyd (At-large), and former Assemblyman Wilfredo Caraballo (At-large).

In February he received an endorsement of William D. Payne and March from Donald Payne, Jr., both of whom who are part a long time Newark political dynasty. He has also been endorsed by the Teamsters, State Senator Teresa Ruiz and Assemblywoman Eliana Pintor-Marin. Jeffries received the endorsements of Board of Chosen Freeholders President Blonnie Watson, Freeholder Vice-President Patricia Sebold and Freeholder D. Bilal Beasley. Hakeem Jeffries, the  Democratic member of the U.S. House of Representatives, representing New York's 8th congressional district in Brooklyn and Queens with roots in Newark, has also endorsed Jeffries. In May he received the endorsement of Eva Longoria. Jeffries was endorsed by The Star-Ledger.

Jeffries conceded the race to Baraka at the Golden Dome Athletic Center on election night.

Scholarship
In 2015 Jeffries has established the Donna Johnson Memorial Scholarship to support the educational development of a young person who has experienced the loss of a parent, guardian, or loved one because of domestic violence, or whose life has otherwise been touched by violence against women.

Success Academy Charter Schools 
Shavar Jeffries resigned from the Board of Directors of the Success Academy Charter Schools in 2017. Jeffries is a critic of Education Secretary Betsy DeVos and President Donald Trump. This position was in conflict with Success Academy chief executive officer Eva Moskowitz, who had supported Hillary Clinton, but was muted in her criticism of Trump until several days after Jeffries' resignation.

The resignation of Jeffries came before Dan Loeb, Success Academy board chair and wealthy hedge fund executive made racial remarks about State Senate Democratic leader Andrea Stewart-Cousins. These comments triggered a PR crisis in the biggest charter network of NYC. Loeb's statement was the black lawmaker "did more damage to people of color than anyone who has ever donned a hood." Moskowitz said an apology for these remarks was necessary. The complete post of Loeb ridiculed the legislator for not supporting charter schools. He lauded State Senator Jeff Klein who was always vocal in backing charter institutions. 93 percent of students enrolled as Success Academy are either Black or Latino. An article published in the New York Post last April 30, 2018 said Loeb will quit as Success Academy's chairman. Loeb was also criticized because of email exchanges with former Deputy Mayor Richard Buery in 2014 regarding the alleged insensitivity of Mayor Bill de Blasio of New York City towards charter school accomplishments.

Education reform remains a controversial policy concern in the USA. The National Assessment of Educational Progress published a gloomy report showing many American high school senior students are not yet ready for college. This woeful situation stimulates the schools choice movement and supporters of charter schools which include Shavar Jeffries. He demonstrated disappointment regarding the low-key political discussion regarding the worsening quality of primary and secondary education.

References

External links
Shavar Jeffires Mayor 2014

We Need More Shavar Jeffries
S@S Magazine
SOTU 2016: President Obama's Education Legacy

American community activists
Politicians from Newark, New Jersey
Living people
1976 births
Seton Hall Preparatory School alumni
Duke University alumni
Columbia Law School alumni
New Jersey lawyers
African-American people in New Jersey politics
Wilmer Cutler Pickering Hale and Dorr associates
New Jersey Democrats
21st-century African-American people
20th-century African-American people